Midgee is a genus of Australian araneomorph spiders in the family Toxopidae, first described by V. T. Davies in 1995.

Species
 it contains nine species:
Midgee alta Davies, 1995 – Australia (Queensland)
Midgee bellendenker Davies, 1995 – Australia (Queensland)
Midgee binnaburra Davies, 1995 – Australia (Queensland)
Midgee littlei Davies, 1995 – Australia (Queensland)
Midgee minuta Davies, 1995 – Australia (Queensland)
Midgee monteithi Davies, 1995 – Australia (Queensland)
Midgee parva Davies, 1995 – Australia (New South Wales)
Midgee pumila Davies, 1995 – Australia (Queensland)
Midgee thompsoni Davies, 1995 – Australia (Queensland)

References

Araneomorphae genera
Spiders of Australia
Toxopidae
Taxa named by Valerie Todd Davies